The Wings of the North Air Museum is an aviation museum formerly located at Flying Cloud Airport in Eden Prairie, Minnesota.

History 
The Wings of the North foundation was established in February 1998 after the Planes of Fame East Museum closed. Two months later, the group organized an airshow. Eventually named AirExpo, it was continued for 18 years despite lacking a permanent location. Although not used for display, the museum purchased Hangar 72D at Flying Cloud Airport for restoration and maintenance in December 2012. On 15 October 2016, a museum was opened on the south side of the airport, near the control tower. Later that year, it added a B-25 and P-40 to its collection. In 2021 the museum lost its lease to the facility.

Collection 

 Beechcraft AT-11 Kansan
 Boeing N2S-1
 General Motors TBM-3E Avenger
 North American AT-6D Texan
 North American P-51D Mustang
 Vought F4U-4 Corsair
 Vultee BT-15 Valiant

See also 
 American Wings Air Museum
 Dakota Territory Air Museum
 Fagen Fighters WWII Museum
 Fargo Air Museum

References

External links 
 

1998 establishments in Minnesota
Aerospace museums in Minnesota
Museums in Hennepin County, Minnesota
Museums established in 1998